Maya may refer to:

Civilizations
 Maya peoples, of southern Mexico and northern Central America
 Maya civilization, the historical civilization of the Maya peoples
 Maya language, the languages of the Maya peoples
 Maya (Ethiopia), a population native to the old Wej province in Ethiopia

Places
 Maya (river), a river in Yakutia, Russia
 Maya (Uda), a river in Khabarovsk Krai, Russia
 Maya, Uganda, a town
 Maya, Western Australia, a town
 Maya Karimata, an island in West Borneo, Indonesia
 Maya Mountains, a mountain range in Guatemala and Belize
 Maya Biosphere Reserve, a nature reservation in Guatemala
 Mount Maya, a mountain in Kobe, Japan
 Maya Station, a railway station in Kobe, Japan
 La Maya (mountain), an alp in Switzerland
 Al Maya or Maya, a town in Libya

Religion and mythology
 Maya religion, the religious practices of the Maya peoples of parts of Mexico and Central America
 Maya mythology, the myths and legends of the Maya civilization
 Maya (religion), in Hinduism and Buddhism, the misperception of reality
Maya (mother of the Buddha) (died 563 BC), mother of the historical Buddha
Mayasura or Maya, a Hindu demon

Military
 Japanese gunboat Maya, a Maya-class gunboat launched in 1886
 Japanese cruiser Maya, a Takao-class cruiser launched in 1930
 JS Maya, a Maya-class destroyer launched in 2018
 Japanese ship class Maya, a list of ships
 Aero L-29 Delfín, NATO reporting name Maya, a Czech military jet trainer aircraft
 Battle of Maya, an 1813 battle of the Peninsular War, between British and French forces

Film and television
 Maya (1949 film), a French drama film directed by Raymond Bernard
 Maya (1961 film), an Indian Hindi film starring Dev Anand, Mala Sinha and Lalita Pawar
 Maya (1966 film), an American film starring Sajid Khan, Jay North, and Clint Walker
 Maya (1967 U.S. TV series), an American television series and sequel to the 1966 film
 Maya the Honey Bee (1975 TV series), a Japanese anime television series
 Maya (1999 film), an Indian trilingual film by Rama Narayanan
 Maya (2001 film), an Indian Hindi film by Digvijay Singh
 Maya the Bee (2012 TV series), a French-German computer-animated comedy television series
 Maya the Bee (2014 film), a 3D German-Australian computer-animated comedy adventure film
 Maya (2015 Pakistani film), a horror film
 Maya (2015 Tamil film), 2015 Indian Tamil-language horror film starring Nayanthara
 Maya 3D, a 2016 Sri Lankan horror film
 Maya (2018 film), a French film
 Maya the Bee: The Honey Games (2018 film), an Australian–German computer animated comedy adventure film
 Maya (2012 TV series), a 2012 Indian medical soap opera television series
 Maya (2018 TV series), 2018 Indian television series
 Maya the Bee: The Golden Orb (2021 film), a 3D German computer-animated comedy adventure film
 Maya TV, a television channel in Honduras

Literature
 Maya (Surendran novel), a novel by K. Surendran
 Maya (Campbell novel), a 2010 novel by Alastair Campbell
 Maya, a 1999 book by Jostein Gaarder
 Maya the Bee, a 1912 children's book by Waldemar Bonsels

Music
 Maya (Banco de Gaia album) (1994)
 Maya (Zubeen Garg album) (1994)
 Maya (Bipul Chettri album) (2016) or its title song
 Maya (Moheener Ghoraguli album) (1997)
 Maya (M.I.A. album) (2010)
 Maya (John Frusciante album) (2020)
 "Maya", a 1968 song by the Incredible String Band from Wee Tam and the Big Huge

Other uses
 Maya language (disambiguation)
 Maya (bird), a folk taxon for several bird species in the Philippines
 Maya (given name), a name (including a list of people and fictional characters with the name)
 Maya (mobile payments), a financial services and digital payments company based in the Philippines
 Autodesk Maya, a computer program for creating 3D graphics
 C.D. Maya, a football club in El Salvador
 Washburn Maya Signature Series, a series of six-string electric guitars created by Washburn Guitars
 Most Advanced Yet Acceptable, a product design principle associated with Form follows function

See also
 
 Mayan (disambiguation)
 List of Mayan languages
 Maaya (disambiguation)
 Maia (disambiguation)
 Maja (disambiguation)
 Mayer (disambiguation)
 Muia (disambiguation)
 Mya (disambiguation)

Language and nationality disambiguation pages